Snuff Jazz is a live album by free jazz band Borbetomagus. It was released in 1989 on Agaric Records.

Track listing

Personnel 
Adapted from Snuff Jazz liner notes.

Borbetomagus
 Don Dietrich – saxophone
 Donald Miller – electric guitar
 Jim Sauter – saxophone

Production and additional personnel
 Bruce Hanke – cover art
 Wharton Tiers – engineering

Release history

References

External links 
 

1989 live albums
Borbetomagus albums